Cockburn railway station was located on the Silverton Tramway serving the town of Cockburn on the New South Wales / South Australian state border.

History
Cockburn station opened on 11 June 1887 when the Silverton Tramway opened from Broken Hill. It was the junction station between the Silverton Tramway and South Australian Railways. Both lines were laid to the same  gauge, allowing trains to cross between the networks, however locomotives were changed at Cockburn.

The station was initially served by one daily train in each direction. By 1908, this had increased to 30 in each direction. The station closed on 9 January 1970 when the Silverton Tramway was replaced by a new standard gauge line.

References

External links
Flickr gallery

Disused railway stations in South Australia
Railway stations in Australia opened in 1887
Railway stations closed in 1970
Silverton Tramway